Gisborne Thistle is a soccer club based in the city of Gisborne, in the North Island of New Zealand. For many years, the club played second-fiddle to neighbours Gisborne City (with whom they share the Childers Road Reserve ground). Their record includes appearances in the latter rounds of the Chatham Cup on numerous occasions, their best performances coming in 1970 and 1971 when they reached the fifth round.

Thistle joined the Central Federation League in 2005, winning the competition that same season and reached the Central League playoffs losing to Stop Out. The decision to withdraw from the league was taken in order to consolidate the team and to explore the concept of merging with City to form a new amalgamated "Team Gisborne".

Chatham Cup 
In 1929 Gisborne Thistle participated in the Chatham Cup competition for its first time.

Honours 
1984 Central League - Division Three North

2005 Central Federation League

References

External links
Central Football Gisborne Thistle page

Association football clubs in New Zealand
Gisborne, New Zealand
Sport in the Gisborne District